Alinah Kelo Segobye is a social development activist and archaeologist, with specialisms in social development and HIV/AIDS and the future of studying the past in Africa and African archaeology.  She is Dean of Human Sciences at the Namibia University of Science and Technology and an elected fellow of the African Academy of Sciences.

Education 
Segobye completed her undergraduate and MA studies at the University of Botswana, and graduated from the University of Cambridge with a PhD in Archaeology in 1994.

Career 
Segobye worked as Deputy Executive Director at the Human Sciences Research Council of South Africa. She then worked at the University of Botswana before entering her current role as Dean of Human Sciences at the Namibia University of Science and Technology. She was President of the PanAfrican Archaeological Association from 2005 to 2010.

Recognition 
Segobye is an elected fellow of the African Academy of Sciences (2018) and an honorary professor at the Thabo Mbeki African Leadership Institute (TMALI), University of South Africa. She serves on the board of the African Comprehensive HIV/AIDS Partnerships (ACHAP).

She was invited to address the second UNESCO Future Forum Africa in 2013. She was a visiting scholar at the Bradford Rotary Peace Centre (2016).

References 

Living people
Botswana women archaeologists
Alumni of the University of Cambridge
Archaeologists of Africa
Botswana archaeologists
Botswana writers
Botswana women writers
Year of birth missing (living people)
University of Botswana alumni
Academic staff of the University of Botswana
Fellows of the African Academy of Sciences